Ron Rice (born November 9, 1972) is a former American football safety in the National Football League.

Rice was signed by the Detroit Lions as an undrafted free agent in 1995. He played college football at Eastern Michigan and graduated with a BA in criminal justice.

Criminal Charges
The New York Times Reported: Three N.F.L. players and a former N.F.L. player were accused in a lawsuit yesterday of drugging and raping a woman at a Las Vegas apartment and hotel room in May 2000. Detroit Lions safety Ron Rice and quarterback Charlie Batch, the former Lions defensive back Tyree Talton and Miami Dolphins wide receiver Dedric Ward are named in the lawsuit, which was filed in Clark County District Court." ,

Sports Illustrated reported "The woman's attorney, John Lukens, said his client believes the players slipped a "date rape" drug into her drink. She only has a partial memory of the next four to six hours after she had the drink. The woman, then 33, recalls being taken to an apartment, where she claims Batch, Ward and Talton repeatedly raped her, according to the suit. The woman also remembers returning to Mandalay Bay, where she says Ward dropped off her, Batch and Talton on his way to the airport. She accuses Batch, Talton and Rice of raping her again in a hotel room. The lawsuit says she remembers begging Talton to stop hurting her. The woman and the three players left the hotel at some point and the woman met some friends in the casino, then went to her own room to sleep. She returned home to Washington on May 7. Her attorney said she went to a Seattle hospital the next day and reported the rape to authorities."

Retirement

Since his football career, Ron Rice is currently a defensive coach for the Farmington Hills (MI) Harrison football team and Michigan Elite Football Club 7 on 7 team.

References

1972 births
Living people
Players of American football from Detroit
American football safeties
Eastern Michigan Eagles football players
Detroit Lions players
University of Detroit Jesuit High School and Academy alumni